Khushal Khan Mena is located in the western suburbs of Kabul, Afghanistan, adjacent to Kabul University. It is an old area that is mostly populated by ethnic Pashtuns.

Terminology
The neighborhood is named after a renowned Pashto poet and warrior, Khushal Khan Khattak. Although the official name is Khushal Khan Khattak Mena, it is usually called Khushal Khan by the residents.

References

Neighborhoods of Kabul